Petrophora divisata, the common petrophora moth, is a species of geometrid moth in the family Geometridae. It is found in North America.

The MONA or Hodges number for Petrophora divisata is 6803.

References

Further reading

 

Lithinini
Articles created by Qbugbot
Moths described in 1811